Lubiewo is a village in Tuchola County, Kuyavian-Pomeranian Voivodeship, in north-central Poland. It is the seat of the gmina (administrative district) called Gmina Lubiewo.

The village has a population of 1,012.

References

Villages in Tuchola County